Kamysty is a district of Kostanay Region in northern Kazakhstan. The administrative center of the district is the selo of Kamysty. Population:

Geography
Kulykol, Teniz and Urkash lakes are located in the district, not far from the Kazakhstan–Russia border.

References

Districts of Kazakhstan
Kostanay Region